Melitón Manzanas González (born 1906 in Donostia-San Sebastián – 2 August 1968) was a high-ranking police officer in Francoist Spain, known as a torturer and the first planned victim of ETA.

Background
Manzanas entered the police force in 1938, in Irun, where he established one of his infamous interrogation centers and collaborated with Nazi Germany — he helped the Gestapo to arrest Jewish people that were trying to escape from Occupied France. He was assigned to Donostia-San Sebastián in 1941, eventually becoming commander of the Brigada Político-Social (BPS), the francoist political police division, in San Sebastián. A Basque himself, he was a vehement opponent of Basque nationalism, which had been revived in the 1960s, and, in particular, to the then fledgling organisation ETA.

Death and aftermath
On 2 August 1968, he was murdered in the first planned killing committed by ETA in response to the killing of Txabi Etxebarrieta. His killers waited for him at his residence and shot him seven times.

Thirty years after his death, Manzanas was awarded the medal of Civil Merit dedicated to the victims of terrorism by José María Aznar. Manzanas' service under Franco's regime, the fact that he was known for having used police torture, and the fact that he was not the first torturer rewarded by the Spanish Government raised some controversy about this award.

See also
List of unsolved murders

Notes 

1906 births
1968 deaths
Antisemitism in Spain
Assassinated police officers
Deaths by firearm in Spain
Francoist Spain
Male murder victims
People from San Sebastián
People killed by ETA (separatist group)
People murdered in Spain
People of the Spanish Civil War
Spanish collaborators with Nazi Germany
Spanish police officers
Spanish terrorism victims
Torturers
Unsolved murders in Spain